Kuzminka is a rural locality (a selo) and the administrative center of Kuzminsky Selsoviet, Zmeinogorsky District, Altai Krai, Russia. The population was 644 as of 2013. There are 15 streets.

Geography 
Kuzminka is located 29 km northwest of Zmeinogorsk (the district's administrative centre) by road. Nikolsk is the nearest rural locality.

References 

Rural localities in Zmeinogorsky District